Misfit: The Series is a Dutch musical-comedy-drama streaming television series, which is produced by NewBe and Splendid Film for Netflix. The series is a continuation of the Dutch film trilogy Misfit (2017–2020), which not only features new characters, but also some actors have returned to their previous roles. The series premiered worldwide on Netflix on October 16, 2021.

Plot 
A completely crazy school year is dawning for the Misfits at Hoogland College, because they want to put a cool musical on stage. In the middle of the preparations, however, they learn that the musical will be banned, because the new headmistress Agnes wants the students to focus on discipline, good grades and learning. She sees the musical as a pure waste of time and energy. But Julia has other things in mind. With the Misfits and her new friends, she finds a way to circumvent the rules of the headmistress and secretly continue to work on the piece. Can the friends realize their dream of a musical and recapture their school?

Cast 
 Djamila as Julia	
 Niek Roozen as Nick	
 Jolijn Henneman as Sterre	
 Fenna Ramos as Esmee	
 Bente Fokkens as Magenta	
 Jill Schirnhofer as Jocelyne	
 Nienke van Dijk as Tara	
 Georgina Verbaan as “Headmistress” Agnes	
 Britt Scholte as Bibi-Anne	
 Noah de Nooij as Jason	
 Simone Giel as Lisa	
 Vincent Visser as Viggo	
 Eliyha Altena as Morris “Snorris”

Episodes

References

External links

2021 Dutch television series debuts
2020s Dutch television series
Dutch-language Netflix original programming
Musical television series
Television shows set in the Netherlands
2020s music television series